Glenn A. Abbey (June 11, 1898 – January 28, 1962) was an American diplomat.

Biography
Abbey was born Glenn Allan Abbey on June 11, 1898, to William Searle and Ida Elmira Abbey in Dodgeville, Wisconsin. He attended Georgetown University. He died on January 28, 1962, in San Antonio, Texas.

Military service
Abbey served in the United States Army during World War I.

Career
After serving in Haiti, Abbey served as U.S. vice consul in Johannesburg, South Africa from 1928 to 1931. This was followed by positions in Nicaragua, Venezuela, Argentina, Paraguay, and Washington, D.C. He was appointed consul at Bombay in 1946. Later he served as U.S. consul in Salonika, Greece from 1950 to 1951. He was the last to serve in the U.S. consulate in Salonika before the rank was changed to Consul General. Abbey was also Counselor of the Legation in Saudi Arabia until June 5, 1953, after which he was transferred to Barcelona, where he was Consul General.

References

1898 births
1962 deaths
United States Army personnel of World War I
People from Dodgeville, Wisconsin
American consuls
United States Army personnel
Georgetown University alumni
American expatriates in Greece
American expatriates in Nicaragua
American expatriates in Venezuela
American expatriates in Argentina
American expatriates in Paraguay
American expatriates in Spain
American expatriates in Saudi Arabia
American expatriates in India
American expatriates in South Africa
Military personnel from Wisconsin